Fentonadle is a hamlet situated  south-west from Camelford in Cornwall, England. It is in the civil parish of St Breward

References

Hamlets in Cornwall